Karaikal (/kʌdɛkʌl/,  /kaʁikal/) is a town of the Indian Union Territory of Puducherry. Karaikal was sold to the French by the  Rajah of Thanjavur and became a French Colony in 1739. The French held control, with occasional interruptions from the British, until 1954, when it was de facto incorporated into the Republic of India (de jure in 1962), along with Mahé, Yanaon, and Pondichéry.

Etymology

The origin of the word Karaikal is uncertain. The Imperial Gazetteer of British  India gives its meaning as 'fish pass'. Both the words 'Karai' and 'Kal' have several meanings, of which the more acceptable ones are 'lime mix' and 'canal' respectively. Hence it has been suggested that the name may mean a canal built of lime mix, however, no trace of such a canal is evident.

History

Kingdom of Tanjore 
Before 1739, Karaikal was under the regime and control of Raja Pratap Singh of Tanjore. In 1738, Pierre Benoît Dumas was anxious to extend the French territory in India by smooth means and negotiated with Sahuji of Thanjavur for possession of Karaikal, the fortress of Karakalcheri and five village for 40,000 chakras. On 14 February 1739 the French took possession of Karaikal town, the fort of Karakalcheri and eight dependent villages. At this point, the King of Thanjavur raised the price for the town of Karaikal and the fort of Karakalcheri to 50,000 chakras. He also demanded a loan of 150,000 chakras without interest repayable in three years against the hypothecation of Mayavaram lands, and an annual rent of 4,000 pagodas for five villages. The French agreed to all the terms except for the payment of 150,000 chakras, which was then reduced to 10,000 chakras, while the annual rental was reduced to two or three thousand chakras. The villages received were Kilaiyur, Melaiyur, Puduthurai, Kovilpathu and Tirumalairayanpattinam. Subsequently, two villages were ceded to the French. Pratap Singh, who succeeded the throne, renewed the demand for a loan of 100,000 chakras, and on receipt of the first instalment of 4,000 chakras he assigned eight more villages to the French viz., Codague (Kondagai), Vanjiyur, Arimullimangalam, Niravi, Dharmapuram, Uzhiapathu, Mattakudi (probably Mathalangudi) and Polagam. On 12 February 1740, he sold these villages for 60,000 chakras, which he had assigned only the previous year for 40,000 chakras.

French colony 

The same year, Dumas pledged Thirunallar Mahanam for 55,350 chakras and also pledged 33 villages for 60,000 chakras. By a treaty signed on 12 January 1750 Pratap Singh ceded to the French 81 villages around Karaikal and cancelled the annual rent of 2,000 pagodas payable for the villages. This was all the territory the French possessed around Thanjavur when they surrendered to the British in 1761. The territory then passed twice to British control before it was finally handed over to the French in 1816/1817 under the Treaty of Paris, 1814.

Independence struggle 

The formation of the Karaikal National Congress on 13 June 1947 and the Karaikal Students' Congress on 31 January 1947 symbolised the first concrete expression of popular desire in Karaikal for independence from French India. The French ruled this district until 31 October 1954, on which date the French flag flying atop the government house at Karaikal was lowered with due military honors before a large gathering of officials and non-officials. Thus the de facto transfer of power took place on 1 November 1954 followed by de jure transfer on 16 August 1962.

Part of India 

Even though the territory was handed over to the Republic of India on 1 November 1954, Karaikal's municipal administration was continued pursuant to the Arrêté dated 8 March 1880. This was replaced by the promulgation of the Pondicherry Municipality Act, 1973, with effect from 26 January 1974. Mr. Gaudart was the first Mayor of Karaikal in 1884.

Geography

Karaikal is a small coastal enclave which was formerly part of French India. Together with the other former French territories of Pondicherry, Yanam, and Mahé, it forms the Union Territory of Puducherry. Karaikal is bounded on the North and South by Nagapattinam district of Tamil Nadu state, on the west by Tiruvarur district (also belonging to Tamil Nadu), and on the East by the Bay of Bengal.

Although Arasalar  and its branches spread through Karaikal, the waters of Kodamurutti and Virasolanar also meet the irrigation needs of the region.

Forming a part of the fertile Cauvery delta, the region is completely covered by the distributaries of Cauveri. Covered completely by a thick mantle of alluvium of variable thickness, the lie of the region is flat having a gentle slope towards the Bay of Bengal in the east. It is limited on the north by the Nandalar and on the south-east by the Vettar. The group of rocks known as Cuddalore formations is met with in the area contiguous to Karaikal region in Nagappattinam District.

Climate 
Köppen-Geiger climate classification system classifies its climate as tropical wet and dry (As).

Governance

The District Collector is the official representative to the Lieutenant Governor and Chief Co-ordinator and Liaison Officer to all Government departments of Karaikal district. District Collectorate, Karaikal is the functional headquarters of Karaikal District.

Karaikal region is made up of Karaikal municipality and the Communes of
 Nedungadu
 Kottucherry
 Neravy
 Thirunallar
 Tirumalarajanpattinam
 Poovam
 Varichikudy

Demographics
As of the 2011 Census of India, Karaikal has  households with a total of  people. Of these 48.7% are male and 51.3% are female. There are  children in the age group 0-6. Scheduled Castes comprised about 11.3% of the population. The literacy rate was 79%.

Culture

The town is made up of Hindus, Muslims, Christians and people of other religious persuasions. The French flavor still persists in Karaikal, sometimes called Fremil (a combination  of French culture and Tamil culture).

Tamil is the predominant native language of the people. As the area was formerly a French possession, the French language is also found, especially among the elder generation.

Karaikal is known for karaikal Ammaiyar and the temple devoted to the Lord Saneeswara at Thirunallar.

Our Lady of Angels Church is the most prominent church in the town.

In Tirumalairayanpattinam, there is a famous temple called Ayirankaliamman temple, ayiram means 1000. We can see this god once in 5 years, because whatever offerings are given to this god, it should be 1008. So they will open for 3 days once in 5 years, and many devotees from all over Tamil Nadu and Puducherry will come and worship.

Karaikal is the Gateway to various places of worship in the eastern coast of Tamil Nadu. Two famous shrines, Velankanni for Christians and Nagore for Muslims are nearby Karaikal.

Karaikal Ammaiyar

Karaikal Ammaiyar is one of the 63 nayanmar who lived in Karaikal. She is one of the renowned saints, who devoted her life for lord shiva. Her birth name is Punithavathi, right from childhood, had great faith in Lord Shiva and worshipped him daily. As a young girl, she built a Sivalingam in sand, stunning people. Her father Dhanathatthan was a Merchant. She chanted Namshivaya Mantra of Lord Shiva several times daily, and took care of devotees of Shiva coming to her village. Later, she was married to Paramathathan, son of a wealthy merchant from Nagapattinam. Once, her husband sent her two mangoes to be kept for him. That day, a hungry Siva devotee came to her residence. Punithavathi gave the guest Curd rice and one of the mangoes. Later, when the husband came home she served a mango, he asked for the second. She was at a loss and prayed to Lord Shiva. Suddenly, a mango appeared in her hands. She served the mango to her husband, who found it divinely delicious compared to the previous one and asked her how she got the second fruit. Since he was not religious, she was scared of revealing the truth. He began suspecting her and asked her to get another fruit. She gave him a mango that she got by prayer, the fruit disappeared when he touched it. He realised that his wife was no ordinary woman.

But she was a divine person and he began to call her "Ammaiyar". As he could no longer treat her as his wife, he left her and moved to Madurai, where he married another woman named Bhakyavathi, through whom he had child. They named her also Punithavathi. Meanwhile, Ammaiyar who is in search of her husband, finds him and his family in Madurai where the husband and family seeks blessing from Ammaiyar, after that incident prayed to Lord Shiva asking for a boon—that she may worship Shiva as a disembodied wraith. Her wish was granted, leaving all her beauty and bodily being. She then took on different form . She became a fiery form of Mount Kailash, climbing it upside down on her head. There, the Goddess Parvati asked about Ammaiyar. Shiva said that Ammaiyar is the mother, who takes care of us. Ammaiyar worshiped Shiva. Shiva greeted her, calling her "Ammaiyae" (my mother) and Ammaiyar replied "Appa" (father to all). Shiva asked for her wish, to which Ammaiyar replied "I want endless and delightful love with you, I don't want to be born, even if I have any birth, I should not forgot you". Shiva asked her to visit him in Thiruvalangadu, which she again did, travelling on her hands and sang and performed a holy dance (Rudhra Thandavam). Ammaiyar sang "Thiruvaalangattu mootha Thirupathigam".

Economy

Most of the people in town are office goers and industrial workers. There are a number of iron and steel rolling mills, spinning mills, tiles, polythene, rubber and chemical industries in Karaikal. Other common sources of the people's income come from business. The prominent source of income of this district is agriculture and fishing. There are 12 big fishing hamlets and around more than 25,000 fishermen (6,000 families) are living in these coastal villages. Their main employment is fishing, exporting and fishing related activities. The other main source is the liquor business,  the tax being less and the cost almost half when compared to the neighbouring state of Tamil Nadu. Karaikal is one of the towns in South India with high cost of living due to French NRI's presence. Thousands of families of origin of Karaikal live in France. The ONGC's office Kaveri rig is at Karaikal.

Transport

Airways
Karaikal Airport is being constructed as a greenfield project. It is the first airport in the country built entirely with private capital. The project received in-principle clearance from the Ministry of Civil Aviation in February 2011. Karaikal Airport's Air Traffic Control, however, will be operated by the Airports Authority of India (AAI). The Airport, spread across , is being developed by Karaikal Airport Private Limited, a subsidiary of Super Airport Private Limited. The first phase of construction includes construction of a 1200-metre runway and a terminal building capable of handling 120 passengers during peak hours. The airport is expected to handle regional turboprop airliners like the ATR-42. A further expansion is planned ten years down the line with a 3500-metre runway and a passenger capacity of 1,000 per hour.

Seaways
Karaikal port is a new deep sea water port being constructed in Karaikal. The port will have a total of nine berths and is constructed for primary transport of coal, textile and cement. The Karaikal port is intended to primarily handle cement and coal to serve the hinterland in Ariyalur, Perambalur and Tiruchi districts. The port is also expected to provide an alternative to the Chennai and Tuticorin ports, which are the major ports in the coastline but are separated by long distance. Further, Karaikal is in the middle of the Tamil Nadu coast, midway between the two deepwater ports of Chennai and Tuticorin. Karaikal - Kankesanthurai ferry service is under development. The development of ferry service between Karaikal in the Union Territory of Puducherry, India, and Kankesanthurai (near Jaffna, Northern Province) in Sri Lanka, a component of the Sagarmala Programme of the Ministry of Ports, Shipping and Waterways for the promotion of coastal shipping.

Roadways
The National Highway NH 32 connects Chennai and Thoothukudi, passes through Karaikal. Karaikal is connected with both National Highways and State Highways. Both Gov't. and Private buses available from Karaikal to Bangalore, Chennai, Coimbatore, Tiruchirapalli, Kumbakonam, Mayiladuthurai, Puducherry, Cuddalore, Chidambaram.

Railways
Karaikal having rail line connected from Tiruchirapalli via Thanjavur, Tiruvarur, Nagapattinam, and Nagore. Presently Rails are available from Karaikal to Bangalore, Mumbai, Chennai, Ernakulam, Tiruchirapalli, Tanjore, Tiruvarur, Nagapattinam, Nagore, Velanganni and currently Karaikal to Peralam Railway line work is under progress.

Education

According to the 2001 Census, Karaikal has literacy rate of 83%. There is a wide network of Educational Institutions right from the Elementary level to Collegiate level in Karaikal region.

Jawaharlal Institute of Postgraduate Medical Education and Research (JIPMER) was established in Karaikal in 2016 with an initial intake of 50 students. The students are selected through entrance exams conducted nationwide.

National Institute of Technology Puducherry was established in Karaikal in 2010. The students are admitted based on Joint Entrance Examination – Main entrance exam score.

Famous personalities 
 K. A. Thangavelu
 Peter Hein
 K. N. Dandayudhapani Pillai
 M. O. H. F. Shahjahan

See also
French India
French colonial empire
French East India Company
Municipal Administration in French India
Marakkar
Karaikal Carnival
Serumavilangai

References

External links

 www.KaraikalPort.com

 
Port cities in India
Enclaves and exclaves
Cities and towns in Karaikal district